John William Macdonald Coshall (21 January 1901 – 1975) was an English footballer who played as a left-back in the Football League for West Ham United. He later played for French club AS Cannes.

Coshall joined West Ham United for the 1928–29 season, along with Erith teammate Arthur Smith, after impressing during preseason games. He made two First Division appearances for the east London club. He went on to join AS Cannes, part of a contingent of British players in the South of France around that time; contemporaries at the club with League experience were Ted Donaghy, Stan Hillier and Willie Aitken.

References

1901 births
1975 deaths
Footballers from Erith
English footballers
Association football fullbacks
Erith & Belvedere F.C. players
West Ham United F.C. players
English Football League players
AS Cannes players
English expatriate footballers
English expatriate sportspeople in France
Expatriate footballers in France